Cicero was launched at Sunderland in 1796 and initially sailed as a West Indiaman. She was briefly captured in 1799 in a single-ship action with a French privateer. Later, she went whale hunting both in the northern whale fishery (1803-1808), and the southern whale fishery (1816-1823). She capsized at Limerick in September 1832 and was condemned there.

Career
Cicero first entered Lloyd's Register (LR) in 1798 with M.May, master, T.Barton, owner, and trade Liverpool–Barbados. Between 1798, and perhaps before, until c.1802, her owners were the Liverpool firm of Barton, Irlam and Higginson.

Capture and recapture
Captain Matthew May acquired a letter of marque on 15 November 1798. On 22 April 1799 Lloyd's List (LL), reported that as Cicero was on her way to Barbados a French privateer captured her. However, Cicero was retaken.

Cicero had been sailing from Cape Verde when she was captured on 25 February.

He captured Cicero, of Liverpool ad 430 tons (bm), put a prize crew on board, and sailed after her captor, the French privateer Democrat, of 12 guns and 100 men. At nightfall United States had to give up the chase and she rejoined Cicero. Cicero had resisted her initial capture and had many casualties. In the 36 or so hours since her capture her French captors had left Ciceros dead and wounded unattended. Barry took the wounded into United Statess sick bay and put the 33-man French prize crew into her hold as prisoners. United States then sailed south to Saint-Pierre, Martinique, where Cicero was libelled.

Captain James Burton sailed her home. He acquired a letter of marque on 2 August 1799. LR (1799) showed her master changing from May to James Burne.

Captain John Crosbie acquired a letter of marque on 25 February 1800.

Greenland whaler
In 1802–1803 her owners sold Cicero and she then spent about five years as a Greenland whaler.

While Haskayne was Ciceros master, he sailed her from Narva to Liverpool. A letter from Elsinor dated 25 October 1803 reported that she had gone onshore at Saltholm. The next issue of LL reported that she had gone onshore at Dragoe, but that she had been gotten off.

Southern whale fishery
Between 1816 and 1823, Cicero made three whaling voyages to the British Southern Whale Fishery for Gale & Co.

1st whaling voyage (1816–1818): Captain Taylor sailed in 1816. He returned to Britain on 13 July 1818 with 500 casks of whale oil, and fins.

2nd whaling voyage (1818–1820): Captain Brown sailed from Britain on 24 August 1818. Cicero put into Delagoa Bay in 1820 to effect repairs, and returned to Britain on 24 March 1820. She was under the command of Captain Kelly when she returned. She underwent a large repair in 1820.

3rd whaling voyage (1820–1823): Captain Baxter sailed on 29 June 1820. Captain Clarke returned Cicero to Britain on 12 August 1823 with 420 casks of whale oil.

Captain Friend sailed from London on 8 July 1825 and arrived at Quebec on 4 September, with passengers.

Fate
Cicero, Evans, master, ran aground in the River Shannon at Limerick on 21 September 1832 and capsized. She was on a voyage from Limerick to Quebec City. She was condemned at Limerick.

Notes, citations, and references
Notes

Citations

References
 
 

1796 ships
Ships built on the River Wear
Age of Sail merchant ships of England
Captured ships
Maritime incidents in 1799
Maritime incidents in 1803
Shipwrecks of Denmark
Whaling ships
Maritime incidents in September 1832
Shipwrecks of Ireland
Shipwrecks in rivers